The Waste Tide is a science fiction novel by the Chinese writer Chen Qiufan. It is the debut novel by the writer.

Writing background 
The story takes place in the imaginary ''Silicon Isle''. The Chinese word ''硅屿'' for Silicon Isle shares a similar pronunciation with Guiyu (Chinese: 贵屿) in Mandarin. In the real world, Guiyu is a town in the Shantou prefecture of Guangdong province in China. And it is Shantou where Chen Qiufan was born and grew up before he entered Peking University.

Situated on the South China Sea coast, Guiyu got famous in the global environmentalist community for its reception of E-waste. The town held the record for being the largest E-waste site up to 2013. Though some residents got rich by electronic recycling, pollution became serious in the town.

Talking about the background of writing the novel, Chen said: ''Choosing my hometown as background to write the story, is related to my thinking of China. To depict the pain of changing China, is just because I desire for she getting better gradually.''

Setting 
The Waste Tide depicts a dystopian China in the post-2020 era. In the Guiyu island, the large electronic recycle industries are in full control of local lineage associations. The laborers who undertake dangerous work for the profit of the Chinese and foreign businessmen who employ them are depicted not as humans, but cyborgs whose bodies and minds have been altered permanently through bio-engineering.

Plot 
Mimi is a 'waste girl', a member of the lowest caste on Silicon Isle. Located off China's southeastern coast, Silicon Isle is the global capital for electronic waste recycling, where thousands of people like Mimi toil day and night, hoping that one day they too will get to enjoy the wealth they've created for their employers, the three scrap families who have ruled the isle for generations.

It all changes when a ship bearing a dangerous cargo arrives at Silicon Isle. What looks like normal e-waste, is actually infected by a virus born out of one of the darkest episodes of WWII, Project Waste Tide. In a fateful accident, Mimi is infected by the virus and becomes the host for an omniscient consciousness, hell-bent on righting all the wrongs that have been done to her people. A class war ignites, one that draws in environmental extremists and waste workers, and involves family feuds and darker conspiracies.

References

External links 
 

2013 Chinese novels
2013 science fiction novels
Chinese science fiction novels
Cyberpunk literature
Dystopian novels
Novels set on islands
Novels set in the future
Novels set in China
2013 debut novels